Purbanchal University (PU) is a public university in Gothgaun, Morang District, Nepal. It was established in 1993 by the Government of Nepal with the goal of preserving, refining, inventing, adopting, extending and transmitting knowledge in an environment that fosters free inquiry and open scholarly debate. Its mission encompasses the development of rural populations, their economies and their environment. Purbanchal University conducts its academic programs through its five constituent campuses and more than 123 affiliate colleges. The university's main campus at Biratnagar covers 545 hectares.

Mission
At present, the university has broadly identified Business Administration, Industry-Technology, Agriculture-Forestry, Environment Rural-Cultural Subsistence and Sustainable Development as specific areas of “Academic Excellence”.

Constituent colleges/centres

School of Management

School of Management is the First Constituent College of Purbanchal University. It introduced the first Bachelor of Business Administration (BBA) Program in Nepal.

The School offers both BBA and MBA programs and captured the National Business Schools Rating Ranking Award from Everest Bank and Business Age in 2013 for Best Eastern Region Business School of Nepal.

Purbanchal University School of Engineering and Technology (PUSET)

Purbanchal University School of Engineering & Technology (PUSET), formerly known as Science & Technology Campus, was established in 2056 BS in Biratnagar. It was established as a constituent campus of Purbanchal University and is the only one of its kind in the Eastern Region, imparting full-fledged information technology based curriculum for undergraduate and graduate students.

It was the pioneer campus to start BCA (Bachelor of Computer Application), a three-year full-time multidisciplinary undergraduate program in the year 2056 BS. It is the first campus to introduce BIT (Bachelor of Information Technology), a four-year full-time multidisciplinary undergraduate program. The student of the campus passing BCA gets the best placement in the country and abroad in the prestigious corporate houses and other organisations. They are also involved in pursuing higher degrees in national and international universities. The first batch of the MCA (Master of Computer Applications), the two-year program was launched in the year 2060 BS as the pioneer program of the nation.

PUSET launched BE a (Bachelor of Engineering in Computer Engineering), a four-year program in the year 2060 BS. The campus decided to follow the standard norms of Nepal Engineering Council.

PUSET is near Biratnagar Airport. The campus is spread in 2x2 bighas of land covered with partial garden and playground. PUSET further launched BE Electronic & Communication at its premises in 2061 BS.

PUSET College has produced some best IT experts and software developers. Notable people include Laxmi Khatiwata, CFO of Simplify 360, which company works for fortune 100 companies of USA and other parts of world. Some notable graduates are working in Facebook, Google, Alexa, Wipro, etc. include Khagendra Barel, Shuban Singh Karki, etc. PUSET campus, although being a government campus, delivers best knowledge in computer, IT and electronics and communication.

Centre for Population and Development (CPAD) 
Centre for Population and Development (CPAD) is established as a constituent body of Purbanchal University. It main idea was fostering academic studies, research and training in the area of population and development in Nepal in 2003. Although other universities in the nation offer population and development related courses and conduct research and training, there is still need for abridging the gap for incorporating grassroots-based practical activities into the University exercises. This need inspired Purbanchal University to establish CPAD.

Currently CPAD offers Master of Science in Population and Rural Development (MSc PRD).

Janata Adarsha Multiple Campus

Janata Adarsha Multiple Campus was established in 2041 BS as an affiliated college to Tribhuvan University. JAMC was handed over to Purbanchal University as a constituent campus by its operational committee in 2060 BS for fostering academic studies in eastern region in different disciplines of higher studies.

Courses offered

Bachelor of arts & Bachelor In law (5 years)              * Bachelor in social work (8 semester, 4 Years)
 3 Years B.Ed. or one year B.Ed. (newly revised internal evaluation based)

References

External links
 Purbanchal University:.:Office of the Examination Management, Biratnagar

Universities and colleges in Nepal
Biratnagar
Educational institutions established in 1993
1993 establishments in Nepal
Purbanchal University